Eva Fonda is a Philippine drama show on ABS-CBN that aired from December 1, 2008, to February 6, 2009, replacing Kahit Isang Saglit. and was replaced by May Bukas Pa. Eva Fonda is a remake of a 1976 film of the same name starring Alma Moreno.

Plot summary
Eva de Jesus (Cristine Reyes) comes from a poor but a loving family in a small Philippine fishing village. After losing her father at an early age, she and her mother Edeng (Sylvia Sanchez) have been making ends meet on their own. De Jesus wishes to finish school and settle down with her boyfriend Joel Dakila (Jason Abalos). She is perpetually targeted by the town's men because of their perception of her as beautiful and innocent.

When town rich kid Val Mendez (Baron Geisler) returns from Manila, he seeks out and rapes de Jesus; causing her life to circle the drain. Her boyfriend leaves her, and her family is devastated. In her quest to seek justice, she accidentally stabs Mendez's father, Don Ismael (Mark Gil). Whilst imprisoned, her sister dies from a freak accident. De Jesus escapes imprisonment and flees to Manila. Whilst there, she saves beauty agency manager Patricia "Tita Patty" Rosal (BB Gandanghari) from an assailant; grateful, Rosal offers her work as a model.

De Jesus's modelling career rises quickly, and Rosal informs her a Japanese company has hired them. She and de Jesus fly to Japan, where they meet company president Toshiro Fonda (Lito Legaspi). Fonda secretly plans to marry de Jesus; de Jesus accepts and their marriage is solemnised; however, a week after their wedding, Toshiro dies from heart complications.

Eva, now surnamed Fonda, returns to the Philippines, only to be preyed on by Mendez again. Mendez has kidnapped Dakila and another friend, Rosanna "Osang" Paredes (Princess Ryan), and confined them in a dilapidated building.

Cast and characters

Main cast 
 Cristine Reyes as Eva de Jesus / Eva Fonda
 Jason Abalos as Joel Dakila

Supporting cast 
 Baron Geisler as Val Mendez
 Princess Ryan as Rosanna 'Osang' Paredes
 Alma Moreno as Dara 'Ms. DL/Millet' Lim
 Mark Gil as Don Ismael Mendez
 Sylvia Sanchez as Edeng de Jesus
 Tetchie Agbayani as Josefina Escop
 Al Tantay as Turing Dakila
 Jean Saburit as Aguida Mendez
 Mika Dela Cruz as Elena 'Leleng' de Jesus
 Owen Banaag as Popoy Dakila
 Bebe Gandanghari as Patricia 'Patty' Rosal
 Dick Israel as Tita Clem
 Lito Legaspi as Toshiro Fonda
 Joross Gamboa as Andoy
 Hazel Ann Mendoza as Daldit/Chariz
 Janna Dominguez as Paris
 Ya Chang as Kenjie
 Justin De Leon as Efren
 Marissa Sanchez as Cita
 Ronnie Lazaro as Ben
 AJ Dee as Martin
 Kat Alano as Clarice
 Lauren Young as Laura
 Kian Kazemi as Banjo
 RR Enriquez as Virgie
 Bodie Cruz as Val's Friend
 Gian Sotto as Val's Friend
 Rez Cortez as Osang's father
 Mike Magat as Badong Cristobal

Awards and nominations

See also
 List of shows previously aired by ABS-CBN
 List of telenovelas of ABS-CBN

References

External links
Sneak Peek: Eva Fonda ABS-CBN
Eva Fonda Drama Show

ABS-CBN drama series
2008 Philippine television series debuts
2009 Philippine television series endings
Thriller television series
Philippine romance television series
Filipino-language television shows
Television shows set in the Philippines
Television shows set in Tokyo